Edmonton Green is a London Overground and National Rail station on the Lea Valley lines which form part of the West Anglia Main Line, located in Edmonton in the London Borough of Enfield, north London.

Its three-letter station code is EDR and it is in Travelcard zone 4.

History
Edmonton Green was opened as Edmonton (High level) on 22 July 1872 by the Great Eastern Railway (GER) on its new, more direct line from London. Edmonton was renamed Lower Edmonton (high level) on 1 July 1883, with the suffix being dropped when the low level station closed. The name of Edmonton Green was adopted in 1992 as being more indicative of the area served and to promote the nearby Edmonton Green Shopping Centre.

The ticket hall was rebuilt in the early 1980s, and barriers were installed in 2012. Lifts to the platform level became operational in 2015.

In 2015 the Lea Valley Lines transferred from Abellio Greater Anglia operation to London Overground. This resulted in the ability of entitled Freedom Pass holders to use their passes at any time, as on the Underground. Edmonton Green was also then added to the Tube map.

Services
Trains are operated by London Overground. The typical off-peak service of trains per hour (tph) is as follows:

 2 northbound to Enfield Town
 2 northbound to Cheshunt
 4 southbound to London Liverpool Street

Connections
London Buses routes 102, 144, 149, 191, 192, 259, 279, 349, 491, W6, W8, school route 616 and night route N279 serve the station, from the adjacent Edmonton Green bus station.

References

External links

Railway stations in the London Borough of Enfield
Former Great Eastern Railway stations
Railway stations in Great Britain opened in 1872
Greater Anglia franchise railway stations
Edmonton, London
Railway stations served by London Overground